Fola may refer to:
Fódla, (sometimes Fóla or Fola), a goddess in Irish mythology
 LÉ Fola (CM12), a Ton-class minesweeper of the Irish Naval Service, named after the Irish goddess
CA Fola Esch, an athletics club from Esch-sur-Alzette, Luxembourg
 CS Fola Esch, an association football club from Esch-sur-Alzette, Luxembourg
 Fola, West Virginia, an unincorporated community in West Virginia, United States

People with the name Fola
Fola Adeola (born 1954), Nigerian entrepreneur
Fola La Follette (1882–1970), American women's suffragist 
Fola Onibuje (born 1984), Nigerian footballer
Fola, nickname of George Foladori (1908-1997), British-Uruguayan cartoonist
Fola Akinnitire (born 1984), Data Scientist